Mivazerol is an α2-adrenergic receptor agonist.

References

Alpha-2 adrenergic receptor agonists
Imidazoles
Salicylamides